Upland Colony is a census-designated place (CDP) and Hutterite colony in Sanborn County, South Dakota, United States. It was first listed as a CDP prior to the 2020 census. The population of the CDP was 178 at the 2020 census.

It is in the southeast part of the county, on high ground overlooking the James River valley to the west.

Demographics

References 

Census-designated places in Sanborn County, South Dakota
Census-designated places in South Dakota
Hutterite communities in the United States